The 1941–42 season was the 35th year of football played by Dundee United, and covers the period from 1 July 1941 to 30 June 1942.

Match results
Dundee United played a total of 38 unofficial matches during the 1941–42 season.

Legend

All results are written with Dundee United's score first.
Own goals in italics

North Eastern League Series 1

North Eastern League Series 2

Supplementary Cup

Mitchell Cup

See also
 1941–42 in Scottish football

References

Dundee United F.C. seasons
Dundee United